Giæver (IPA: [ˈjeːvər]) is a Norwegian surname that may refer to
Anders Giæver (born 1961), Norwegian journalist and author 
Ivar Giaever (born 1929), Norwegian-American physicist 
Jo Giæver Tenfjord (1918–2007), Norwegian librarian, children's writer and translator 
Joachim Giæver (1856–1925), Norwegian-born American civil engineer 
John Schjelderup Giæver (1901–1970), Norwegian author and polar researcher 
Giaever Glacier in Antarctica 
Giaever Ridge  in Antarctica 
Knut T. Giæver (born 1926), Norwegian publisher
Morten Giæver (born 1982), Norwegian football midfielder 
Ola Krogseng Giæver (1885–1945), Norwegian farmer and politician
Ole Giæver (born 1977), Norwegian film director, screenwriter and actor 
Torbjørn Giæver Eriksen (born 1970), Norwegian politician 

Norwegian-language surnames